Kinaloor  is a village in Kozhikode District in the state of Kerala, India. Kinalur is situated near by Vattoli in Thamarassery - Balussery State Highway.

Demographics
As of the 2011 Census of India, Kinalur had a population of 9,930 with 4664 males and 5266 females.

References

See also 
 Kinalur inscription

Villages in Kozhikode district